= Bag It! =

2011 video game

- Developer(s): Hidden Variable Studios
- Platform(s): iOS, Android
- Release: October 15, 2011
- Genre(s): Puzzle

Bag It! is a puzzle game developed by American studio Hidden Variable Studios and released on October 15, 2011 for iOS and Android. The player is tasked with bagging up a collection of grocery items, with a gameplay similar to Tetris.

== Critical reception ==
The game has a rating of 93% on Metacritic based on 4 critic reviews.
